Parigi may refer to:

Places 
France
 Paris, France (in Italian)

India
 Parigi, Ranga Reddy, India
 Parigi, Anantapur, Andhra Pradesh, India

Indonesia
 Parigi, Central Sulawesi, capital of Parigi Moutong Regency
 Parigi, South Sulawesi, a district in Gowa Regency, South Sulawesi
 Parigi, Southeast Sulawesi, a district in Muna Regency, Southeast Sulawesi
 Parigi, West Java, the capital of Pangandaran Regency, formerly Ciamis Regency, West Java Province
 Parigi Moutong Regency, a regency of Central Sulawesi
 Parigi Barat, a district in Parigi Moutong Regency
 Parigi Selatan, a district in Parigi Moutong Regency
 Parigi Tengah, a district in Parigi Moutong Regency
 Parigi Utara, a district in Parigi Moutong Regency

Italy
 Parigi, Italy, a village in the Province of Parma, Emilia-Romagna

Iran
 Parigi, Iran, a village in Fars Province

People 
 Alfonso Parigi (1606-1656), Italian architect and scenographer, the son of Giulio Parigi
 Alfonso Parigi the Elder (died 1590), Italian architect and designer working in Florence for the Grand Duke of Tuscany
 Giacomo Parigi (born 1996),  Italian football player.
 Giulio Parigi (1571-1635), Italian architect and designer
 Jean-François Parigi (born 1960), French politician
 Susanna Parigi (born 1961), Italian singer, songwriter, pianist and author
 Parigi Coppelletti (active in 1590s), Italian painter